Kayli Mills (born December 10, 1994) is an American actress who voices for English versions of anime and Japanese video games. Some of her major roles include Emilia in Re:Zero, Akira Kazama in Street Fighter V, Alice Zuberg in Sword Art Online, and Keqing in Genshin Impact. She is not related in any way to fellow voice actor Daman Mills.

Personal life 
Mills uses they/she pronouns, and is non-binary.

Filmography

Anime

Film

Video games

References

External links 
 
 
 
 

1994 births
Living people
People from Michigan
University of New South Wales alumni
Funimation
Video game actors
American voice actors
21st-century American actors
American non-binary actors
Actors from Los Angeles